Chandgam (also Known as Babgom) is a village in Pulwama district of Jammu and Kashmir in India. It is located 7 km(5.5 mi ) towards East from District Headquarters Pulwama and  33.3 km(27.5 mi) from State Capital Srinagar.

It is referred as "Babgom" in vernacular due the presence of various saints in the region in the previous century, revered by thousands across the district namely "Zaina bibi", "Moomin saeb" etc. . It is flanked by villages Navnagri, Tumlhal, Lassipora, Armulla and Thal-shadipora . Upper karewa (hilllock) consists primarily of Apple, Pear, walnut, almond orchards while Tahab-Chakoora-Naina road separates the lower lying fertile lands used primarily for agriculture and settlements. The residential area is divided into many mohallas such as Peer mohalla, Malik mohalla, Hajam mohalla etc. for identification.

The fauna consists of the Himalayan black bear, Wild Foxes and Levantine Viper (gunas) found occasionally in the upper karewas along with domesticated animals . A model school operates in the area .

The major religion in the village is ISLAM ( 100% ) and primary source of income is agriculture, fruits and small time business. The village itself is internally demarcated as haer gam and bon gam ( upper/lower lying along east -west ).

PHC TAHAB is the nearest hospital facility and Govt high school, Tahab is the nearest Educational institution.

In 2019, plans for installing a Fruit Mandi in the region gained traction yet to reach fruition.Tahab-Chakoora-Naina Road is a major interdistrict road junction nearby.

References

Villages in Pulwama district